"Countdown" is a song by DJs Hardwell and MAKJ.

Background 
In September 2013, a teaser was posted by Revealed Recordings for the song. The song was remixed by Micetro and Bamboora.

Track listing

Charts

References 

2013 songs
2013 singles
Hardwell songs
Songs written by Hardwell